Pseudoltinomys is a prehistoric rodent that lived approximately 30 million years ago, during the Oligocene epoch. It outwardly resembles a gerbil, but may have been related to kangaroo rats or may represent an early offshoot of rodents with no modern relatives.

References 

Eocene rodents
Oligocene rodents
Oligocene mammals of Europe
Paleogene France
Fossils of France
Quercy Phosphorites Formation